Prisioneros de una noche is a 1962 Argentine film.

Cast
 María Vaner		
 Alfredo Alcón		
 Osvaldo Terranova		
 Elena Tritek		
 Juan José Edelman		
 Osvaldo Pacheco		
 Salo Vasochi		
 Ovidio Fuentes		
 Aníbal Troilo		
 Astor Piazzolla

External links
 

1962 films
1960s Spanish-language films
Argentine black-and-white films
1960s Argentine films